Juan Ignacio González del Castillo (Cadiz February 16, 1763 – September 14, 1800) was a Spanish author of comic theatre.

References 

1763 births
1800 deaths
Spanish dramatists and playwrights
Spanish male dramatists and playwrights
People from Cádiz